This article lists the official squads for the 2014 Women's Rugby World Cup in France.

Pool A

Head Coach:  Francois Ratier

Head Coach:  Gary Street

Head Coach:  Euini Lale Faumuina

Head Coach:  Inés Etxegibel

Pool B

Head Coach:  Philip Doyle

Head Coach:  Adam McDonald

Head Coach:  Brian Evans

Head Coach:  Peter Steinberg

Pool C

Head Coach:  Paul Verrell

Head Coach:  Christian Galonnier

Head Coach:  Lawrence Sephaka

Head Coach:  Rhys Edwards

Notes and references

2014
squads